"Cotton Candy" is an instrumental written by Russ Damon and recorded by Al Hirt for his 1964 album, Cotton Candy. The piece was also featured on Hirt's greatest hits album, The Best of Al Hirt.

Chart performance
"Cotton Candy" reached No. 15 on the Billboard Hot 100 and No. 3 on the Easy Listening chart in 1964.

References

1964 singles
1964 songs
Al Hirt songs
RCA Victor singles
1960s instrumentals